Louisa Terrell (born August 17, 1969) is an American lawyer and government official. Since 2021, Terrell has served as director of the White House Office of Legislative Affairs under President Joe Biden. Prior to this, Terrell served in a variety of government and private sector positions, including as a member of Biden's Senate staff and as a public policy director at Facebook.

Early life and education 
Terrell was born in Delaware on August 17, 1969. She graduated from Tufts University, and Boston College Law School.

Career 
In 2001, she was on the Senate staff of Joe Biden. She was chief of staff for Cory Booker, and advisor to Tom Wheeler. She was a legislative aide to Barack Obama. She was director of federal policy and strategy, at Yahoo, public policy director at Facebook, and was deputy general counsel at McKinsey & Company. She was visiting faculty at the Biden Institute.

Biden Administration 
Following Joe Biden's inauguration as President of the United States, Terrell was appointed director of the White House Office of Legislative Affairs. In 2021, she lobbied moderate Republicans and Democrats on the American Jobs Plan, which eventually passed the United States Senate in August 2021 as the Infrastructure Investment and Jobs Act.

References 

21st-century American women lawyers
21st-century American lawyers
Biden administration personnel
Boston College Law School alumni
Living people
Tufts University alumni
Year of birth missing (living people)